Mathias Laustrup Kristensen  (born 21 March 1997) is a Danish footballer who plays for FC Fredericia.

Career

Esbjerg fB
Kristensen came to Esbjerg fB from Næsbjerg RUI, where his dad was his coach the most of the years he spent there. After five years at Esbjerg and on his 15-years birthday, Kristensen signed a youth contract with the club. In March 2013, Kristensen went on a trial at Manchester United and afterwards on a trial at Fulham. Already at the age of 16, Kristen was a part of the U19 squad at Esbjerg.

From the 2015/16 season, Kristensen was permanently promoted to the first team squad at the age of 18. In September 2015, Kristen extended his contract until the summer 2018. His official debut came 10 months  after he was permanently promoted to the first team squad, in May 2016 against SønderjyskE where he came from the bench with 10 minutes left. This game and one later on the same month, was the only two games he played in that season for the first team.

In September 2017, Kristensen's contract was extended once again, this time until the summer 2021. Kristensen got his breakthrough in the 2017/18 season, where he played 24 games, scoring 5 times and making 5 assist. He was often used on the wings though his regular position was in the midfield. In October 2017, he scored a hattrick against Vendsyssel FF, all three goals on set pieces.

Kristensen left the club in the summer 2021, as his contract expired.

Fredericia
On 2 June 2021, Kristensen signed a two-year deal with FC Fredericia.

References

External links
Mathias Kristensen at DBU

1997 births
Living people
People from Varde Municipality
Danish men's footballers
Denmark youth international footballers
Denmark under-21 international footballers
Danish Superliga players
Esbjerg fB players
FC Fredericia players
Association football midfielders
Danish 1st Division players
Sportspeople from the Region of Southern Denmark